Lyudmila Pavlovna Gromova (born 4 November 1942) is a retired artistic gymnast from Russia. She competed at the 1964 Summer Olympics in all artistic gymnastics events and won a gold medal in the team allround competition. Individually her best result was 16th place in the floor exercise.

She was born as Lyudmila Permyakova, then changed her last name to Gromova, and later to Aseeva. She has a sister, Valentina (b. 1947); they lost their father in World War II. In 1957, Lyudmila moved to Moscow, married, graduated from an institute of pedagogy in Moscow Oblast in 1975, and later worked as a gymnastics coach.

References

1942 births
Living people
Soviet female artistic gymnasts
Gymnasts at the 1964 Summer Olympics
Olympic gymnasts of the Soviet Union
Olympic gold medalists for the Soviet Union
Olympic medalists in gymnastics
Medalists at the 1964 Summer Olympics